Külliki Kübarsepp (born 27 June 1981 in Pühajärve, Valga County) is an Estonian political scientist and politician. She has been a member of XIII Riigikogu.

In 2006, she graduated from University of Tartu in political science. From 1999 to 2012 she was a member of Pro Patria Union/Pro Patria and Res Publica Union. Since 2014 she is a member of Estonian Free Party.

Kübarsepp is in a relationship with fellow Estonian Free Party politician Andres Herkel, with whom she has a daughter.

References

1981 births
Living people
Estonian political scientists
Women members of the Riigikogu
Members of the Riigikogu, 2015–2019
Estonian Free Party politicians
University of Tartu alumni
People from Otepää Parish
21st-century Estonian women politicians